The men's floor competition at the 2012 Summer Olympics was held at the North Greenwich Arena on 5 August.

Competition format

The top eight competitors in the qualification phase (with a limit of two per country) advanced to the apparatus final. Qualification scores were then ignored, with only final-round scores counting.

Qualification results

*When two or more athletes record the same total score, the one with the highest execution score finishes ahead. If the E-score is the same, then the one with the highest difficulty score finishes ahead. If the D-score is also the same, then they finish tied.

Final

*When two athletes record the same total score, the one with the higher execution score finishes ahead.

References

Gymnastics at the 2012 Summer Olympics
2012
Men's events at the 2012 Summer Olympics